Štěpán Tesařík (born 6 July 1978 in Prague) is a Czech athlete who specializes in the 400 metres hurdles.

He finished sixth at the 2002 European Championships. In 4 × 400 metres relay he won the gold medal at the 2000 European Indoor Championships and finished fourth at the 2002 European Championships.

His personal best 400 metres hurdles time is 49.09 seconds, achieved in August 2003 in Szombathely.

Štěpán Tesařík is a grandson of World War II hero Richard Tesařík.

External links

1978 births
Living people
Czech male hurdlers
Athletes (track and field) at the 2004 Summer Olympics
Olympic athletes of the Czech Republic
Athletes from Prague